Apudessive case (abbreviated ) is used for marking a juxtaposing spatial relation, or location next to something ("next to the house"). The case is found in Tsez, Bezhta and other Northeast Caucasian languages.

References

Grammatical cases